The 1891–92 Football Alliance was the third and final season of the Football Alliance, an association football league which was set up in England as an alternative to the Football League, which had begun in the 1888–89 season.

Three new clubs joined the Football Alliance, following the expansion of the Football League to 14 teams, and the defection of Sunderland Albion to the Northern League. These new teams were Ardwick (later Manchester City), Burton Swifts and Lincoln City.

At the end of the season the Football Alliance was disbanded and merged with the Football League, which was expanded to two divisions. Champions Nottingham Forest together with Newton Heath and The Wednesday were elected to the enlarged sixteen-team First Division.  The remaining teams were joined by Northwich Victoria, Burslem Port Vale and Sheffield United to form a twelve-team Second Division. However, Birmingham St George's disbanded at the end of the season due to financial problems.

Final league table

Results

Election to the Football League
Two new clubs were elected to the Football League in the re-election process. West Bromwich Albion, although finishing in the bottom four teams of the Football League, were not required to seek re-election as they were the FA Cup holders. Two of the other three teams were duly re-elected. As a result, three new teams were elected to the League. The voting went as follows:

When a second division was later added to the league, Darwen were elected to participate, along with the remaining Football Alliance teams except for Birmingham St George's (who disbanded due to financial problems).

See also
 1891-92 in English football
 1891 in association football
 1892 in association football

References

1891-92
2